Annabel Tiffin (born 25 November 1968) is an English broadcast journalist and presenter, currently working as a main presenter and producer for the BBC regional news programme North West Tonight.

Tiffin presents the main 6:30pm programme alongside Roger Johnson as well as weekday late news bulletins and the North West edition of the weekly political programme Sunday Politics. Annabel started her second stint presenting Politics North West on Sunday 16 May. This edition going out live across the Country on BBC ONE HD.

Early life
Originally from Southampton, Tiffin was brought up in Cirencester. Her father Peter Tiffin was a television director and producer for more than 30 years. She has two sisters, Miranda and Serena.

Career
Tiffin moved to Manchester in 1990 to begin work at the Stockport Express Advertiser. She moved into local radio, working for Signal Radio in Stoke and BRMB in Birmingham, before becoming a presenter and reporter for the local cable television station Birmingham Live TV, which Tiffin launched in 1995 as the first person on air. After 18 months, she moved to Central Television in Nottingham and became a reporter and bulletin presenter for Central News East.

Tiffin joined BBC North West in 2003 as a presenter and producer for the late North West Tonight bulletin on weekdays. She later became a regular stand-in anchor on the main evening programme before becoming a main anchor in May 2012. Alongside regional news, she has also worked on regional current affairs series Inside Out North West and The Politics Show as well as coverage of local and general elections.

In 2022, Tiffin received an honorary Doctor of Arts degree from the University of Bolton for her outstanding contribution to broadcasting.

Personal life
She is married with a son (born July 2003) and daughter (born March 2000). She married John Williamson in October 1998 in Stockport. She lives in Cheadle Hulme.

References

External links
 
 BBC North West Tonight – Annabel Tiffin profile
 BBC Politics Show North West – Annabel Tiffin profile
 BBC Politics Show North West – about the programme

1968 births
Living people
BBC newsreaders and journalists
BBC North West newsreaders and journalists
People from Cheadle Hulme
People from Cirencester